The "Royal Salute" was the first national anthem of the Kingdom of Afghanistan, in use from 1926–1943. It was used whenever a national anthem needed to be played during international occasions. It usually only has a melody, with no lyrics to be sung in public. In 1943, it was replaced by a second national anthem: Our Brave and Noble King.

It is used as the anthem of the Royal Afghan Government in Exile with the lyrics of the poem Ali Bood, written by Rumi.

References

External links 

Afghan songs
Asian anthems
Historical national anthems
National symbols of Afghanistan
National anthem compositions in G major